Melvin Grootfaam (born 20 August 1990 in Amsterdam, Netherlands) is a Dutch footballer who currently plays for AFC in the Dutch Tweede Divisie. He formerly played for Telstar. of the Eerste Divisie league.

References

Dutch footballers
Dutch sportspeople of Surinamese descent
Footballers from Amsterdam
1990 births
Living people
SC Telstar players
Amsterdamsche FC players
Eerste Divisie players
Tweede Divisie players
Derde Divisie players
Association football forwards